USS Canberra (LCS-30) is an  of the United States Navy. She is the second US ship to be named Canberra, after the Australian cruiser , named after the Australian capital city and sunk during the Battle of Savo Island.

Construction and career 
Canberra was built in Mobile, Alabama by Austal USA. She was christened on 5 June 2021, with Australian Minister of Foreign Affairs, Marise Payne, serving as the ship's sponsor. Arthur Sinodinos, Australia's Ambassador to the United States was in attendance at the ceremony on behalf of Australia. 

The US Navy accepted delivery of the ship at Austal USA's facilities in Mobile on 21 December 2021. At this time it was scheduled to be commissioned in mid-2022. On 22 June 2022 Canberra arrived at San Diego Naval Base, its home port.

References

 

Independence-class littoral combat ships